Helena Amélia Oehler Stemmer (1927 –  2016) was a Brazilian civil engineer and university professor.

Early life and education 
Helena Amélia Oehler Stemmer was born in Porto Alegre on 11 November 1927.

She graduated in civil engineering at the Universidade Federal do Rio Grande do Sul (UFRGS) in 1954.

Career 
On 15 May 1955, Helena Amélia Oehler Stemmer married her university colleague Caspar Erich Stemmer and soon got a job at the company Azevedo Bastian Castilhos S / A Construções. The couple had a son, Marcelo Stemmer.

When her husband, then dean of Universidade Federal de Santa Catarina (UFSC) made a study exchange trip to the Technical University of North Rhine-Westphalia in Aachen (RWTH Aachen) in Germany, Helena attended structural analysis classes in German at the university.

Stemmer started teaching at UFSC in 1969, a year after the foundation of the civil engineering course, becoming the first teacher in the discipline of construction stability at the university. She was coordinator of the civil engineering course, head of department and director of the Technological Center (CTC).

She was the only woman to head an engineering department at CTC in almost 50 years.

She dedicated herself to teaching for almost three decades until her retirement in June 1992, and co-authored the book Memórias da Engenharia Civil.

Personal life 
In her youth, she practiced athletics at the Porto Alegre Gymnastics Society. Later in life, she was known for her interest and knowledge of opera, and sang as a soprano. She was celebrated for her good memory, enthusiasm for reading and broad cultural interests.

Death and burial 

Helena Amélia Oehler Stemmer died around noon on Monday, 28 March 2016. She was buried in the Jardim da Paz Cemetery in Florianópolis alongside her husband.

References

External links 

 Fotografia de Helena e seu marido Caspar

Brazilian civil engineers
2016 deaths
1927 births
People from Porto Alegre
Federal University of Rio Grande do Sul alumni
Women engineers